The Women's Giant Slalom in the 2020 FIS Alpine Skiing World Cup involved 6 events. The season had been scheduled for nine events, but all of the last three giant slaloms were canceled.

Defending champion Mikaela Shiffrin from the United States was second in the very tight discipline standings after 5 events when her father Jeff suffered what proved to be a fatal head injury at the start of February, and Shiffrin missed the remainder of the season.  Italian skier Federica Brignone held the discipline lead with three events remaining, but (as described below) none of those events took place. 

First, the GS scheduled for Ofterschwang, Germany was canceled due to lack of snow and a bad forecast.  Then the finals, scheduled for Sunday, 22 March in Cortina d'Ampezzo, Italy, were cancelled due to the COVID-19 pandemic. And finally, the one remaining giant slalom, scheduled in Åre, Sweden, for which Shiffrin had planned to return, was canceled due to COVID infections being detected among the skiers.    Thus, the current leader in each discipline automatically became the season winner of the crystal globe for that discipline.

Standings

DNF1 = Did Not Finish run 1
DNQ = Did Not Qualify for run 2
DNF2 = Did Not Finish run 2
DNS = Did Not Start

See also
 2020 Alpine Skiing World Cup – Women's summary rankings
 2020 Alpine Skiing World Cup – Women's Overall
 2020 Alpine Skiing World Cup – Women's Downhill
 2020 Alpine Skiing World Cup – Women's Super-G
 2020 Alpine Skiing World Cup – Women's Slalom
 2020 Alpine Skiing World Cup – Women's Combined
 2020 Alpine Skiing World Cup – Women's Parallel
 World Cup scoring system

References

External links
 Alpine Skiing at FIS website

Women's Giant Slalom
FIS Alpine Ski World Cup women's giant slalom discipline titles